The Federation of Pro-Independence Co-operation Committees is a political party in New Caledonia supporting the island's independence from France, although it is the most moderate of all nationalist parties.

The FCCI was founded in 1998 by three dissident members of the Kanak and Socialist National Liberation Front (FLNKS) who opposed waiting for a settlement to a mining dispute in the North until agreeing on sitting down for negotiations which eventually led to the Nouméa Accord. In the 1999 elections, the new party obtained 4 seats in the Congress of New Caledonia and formed a common group with the anti-independence Rally for Caledonia in the Republic (RPCR). While still in favour of independence, it supports talks and co-operation between factions in the meantime and opposes the concept of ethnic nationalism and ethnic independence supported by the FLNKS. The FCCI's close affiliation with the RPCR has often made it the centre of criticism, mostly on its left, calling it a "RPCR bis".

The FCCI's co-operation with the RPCR led to its downfall in the 2004 election, where it won only one seat in Congress (from the Loyalty Islands). Its sole Congressman, Cono Hnaéjé Hamu, formed a common group with the RPCR but Hamu left to re-join the Caledonian Union.

In the latest legislative elections of May 10, 2009, it won 0.6% of the popular vote, and no seats in the Congress of New Caledonia.

Melanesian socialism
Secessionist organizations
Separatism in France
Social democratic parties in Oceania
Socialist parties in New Caledonia